Zvukovaya Dorozhka ("sound track") is  Russia's oldest hit parade in the field of popular music. It was founded in 1975 and has been published monthly in Moskovskij Komsomolets since 1977. It features both Russian and international acts. Since 2003 it is presented in a ceremony in concert halls. It's considered one of the major Russian music awards.

History
The founder and first parade presenter was Yu. V. Filonov, who created its first issue in the fall of 1975. The column informed the audience about the existing Soviet performers and some foreign stars, usually from socialist countries. The first award ceremony based on readership polls was held in January 2003.

Categories
Breakthrough of the Year
Person of the Year
Artist of the Year
Female Singer of the Year
Male Singer of the Year
Duet of the Year
Group of the Year
Innovator of the Year
Cover (Tribute) of the Year
Rock
Hip-Hop
Pop
Dance
Alternative
Album of the Year
Video of the Year
Russian Concert of the Year
Foreign Tour of the Year
Foreign Artist of the Year
Event of the Year
Trends (Fashionable Music) of the Year
Sexy Male
Sexy Female
Disappointment of the Year

References

Russian music awards